Marcella Silvestri (born 25 April 1961) is an Italian voice actress. She contributes to voice characters in cartoons, anime, movies and more content.

Career
Silvestri is well known for providing the voice of the protagonist Hamtaro in the Italian language of the anime series Hamtaro. She also provided the voice of Koyuki Azumaya in the Italian-language version of the anime series Keroro Gunso. And She Known The Voice of Misaki Uzumaki in the Italian-language version of the anime series of Naruto.

She works at Merak Film, Studio P.V., Studio Asci and other dubbing studios in Italy.

Voice work

Anime and animation
 Miki in Angel's Friends
 Hay Lin in W.I.T.C.H.
 Hamtaro in Tottoko Hamtaro
 Hamtaro in Tottoko Hamutaro Hai!
 Luna in Ronin Warriors
 Koyuki Azumaya in Keroro Gunso
 Emma in Stoked
 Princess Ami in Puppy in My Pocket: Adventures in Pocketville
 Alice Gehabich in Bakugan Battle Brawlers
 Alice Gehabich in Bakugan Battle Brawlers: New Vestroia
 Simon in Alvin and the Chipmunks (TV series)
 Shirousa in Sugarbunnies
 Shirousa in Sugarbunnies: Chocolat!
 Shirousa in Sugarbunnies: Fleur
 Krillin (First dub) in Dragon Ball Z
 Krillin in Dragon Ball Z: Cooler's Revenge (Second dub)
 Krillin in Dragon Ball Z: Return of Cooler (Second dub)
 Mme. Fluffé in Best Ed
 Angelina Jeanette Mouseling in Angelina Ballerina
 Angelina Jeanette Mouseling in Angelina Ballerina: The Next Steps
 Ruby in Jewelpet
 Miki in Shugo Chara!
 Burdine Maxwell in Bratz (TV series)
 Zoisite (Second voice) in Sailor Moon
 Berthier in Sailor Moon R
 VesVes in Sailor Moon S
 Francis X. Bushlad in Taz-Mania
 Misuzu Midorikawa in Lady!!
 Misuzu Midorikawa and Sophie Montgomery in Hello! Lady Lynn
 Harley Quinn in The Batman
 Doremi Harukaze in Ojamajo Doremi
 Jirōmaru Takaba in Bakusō Kyōdai Let's & Go!!
 Reika in Genesis of Aquarion
 Milo Oblong in The Oblongs
 Benji in Jin Jin and the Panda Patrol
 Ally in Eon Kid
 Yū Inagawa in Comic Party
 Natsue Awayuki in Prétear
 Stashia in Megami Paradise
 Keshimaru in Pastel Yumi, the Magic Idol
 Madoka Ayukawa in Kimagure Orange Road (First dub)
 Corona in Spider Riders
 Kanade Yumeno in Onegai My Melody
 Arnold Perlstein in The Magic School Bus'
 Nancy in The Story of Pollyanna, Girl of Love Athena Gilnande in Najica Blitz Tactics Nut in Magical Angel Sweet Mint Arbell, Bellemere, Kodama, Makino (Episode 45), Nico Olvia, and Michael and Hoichael's mother in One Piece Shuzo "Shu" Matsutani in Legendz Sherry LeBlanc in Yu-Gi-Oh! 5D's Miyu in Vampire Princess Miyu Ryoko Tsugumo in Area 88 Lum in Urusei Yatsura 2: Beautiful Dreamer (Second dub)
 Juliet in Romeo x Juliet Geo in Team Umizoomi Gerty in Pic Me Susan Test in Johnny Test Sidney Poindexter in Danny Phantom Mooris Moony in Ricky Sprocket: Showbiz Boy Willow in A Kind of Magic Ethelbert the Tiger in Ethelbert the Tiger Kyoko Aoi in Future GPX Cyber Formula Aiko Nonohara in Hime-chan's Ribbon Tsukushi Makino in Boys Over Flowers Ken in Floral Magician Mary Bell Damia in Bosco Adventure Verdi in The Mozart Band and others

Live action shows and movies
 Marie Rogers in Romeo! Geena Fabiano in Unfabulous Dulcea in Mighty Morphin Power Rangers: The Movie Katie in I Hate My 30's Raquel 'Rocky' Donatelli in Laguna Beach: The Real Orange County Maddie Harrington in Ally McBeal Samantha Morgan in Hang Time (TV series) Julia Field in Rituals (TV series)''
 and others

See also
 List of non-English language Stoked voice actors

References

External links
 

Living people
Actors from Genoa
Italian voice actresses
1961 births